Diandra Soares is an Indian model, fashion designer and television host. She is mostly famous for her bald looks on the ramp. She was a contestant in the reality show Bigg Boss 8 in 2014.

Early life 
Soares was born to a middle-class family in Bandra, Maharashtra. Her family never had any relation with the modelling world. After having schooling at Bombay, she pursued her education from St. Xaviers. Madhu Sapre was the former Indian model who inspired Soares in modelling.

Personal life 
Diandra was in a relationship with Gautam Gulati during her stay inside the Bigg Boss house. In 2016, Diandra’s web series called 'Do It Like Diandra’ was in works.

Modelling career 
Soares has been active in the field of modelling since the age of 16. Her first assignment was for Tips and Toes and her first show was for McDowell's. In 1995, she was crowned as Miss Bombay, and that helped her to get contracts from various leading brands like Dinesh Suitings, VIP Lingeries, Tillsbury whiskey. She has walked for many international fashion shows in her career which were conducted by Gucci, Leonard Paris, Emanuel Ungaro, Sonia Rykiel, and Miami Fashion Show.

Soares is noted for her bald looks on the ramp. Designers opened and closed the shows with Soares in the Lakme Fashion Week. In September 2013, she shaved her head again. Soares commented that it was done for religious reasons and by going bald she felt spiritually empowered. She also added that her bald head might prevent her entry to many fashion weeks. She once again shaved her head during her session in Big Boss 8.

Media career 
Soares was a contestant in the popular celebrity stunt show Fear Factor: Khatron Ke Khiladi in its 4th season in 2011. She became one of the popular contestants and survived to the end and became the first runner up. Soares became a contestant on the Indian TV reality show Bigg Boss in its eighth season which started airing in September 2014 on Colors.  She was evicted after 12 weeks on 14 December 2014 (Day 84). In 2016, Diandra made a web series called 'Do It Like Diandra'.

Television

Web

Movies

References

External links
 
 

Living people
Female models from Mumbai
Actresses from Mumbai
Actresses in Hindi television
21st-century Indian actresses
Year of birth missing (living people)
People from Bandra
Fear Factor: Khatron Ke Khiladi participants
Bigg Boss (Hindi TV series) contestants